Antonov, or Antonov Aeronautical Scientist/Technical Complex (Antonov ASTC) is a Ukrainian aircraft manufacturing and services company.

Antonov may also refer to:

 Antonov (surname)
 Antonov Airlines, a Ukrainian cargo airline, division of the Antonov ASTC
 Antonov Airport, or Hostomel Airport, a Ukrainian airport, operated by the Antonov ASTC
 Antonovka, an apple cultivar